The Taiwan International Documentary Festival (TIDF) is a documentary film festival held biannually in Taipei, Taiwan.

Awards 
A number of prizes are awarded at the festival, including:
For films in the international competition:
Grand Prize
Merit Prize
For films in the Asian Vision Competition:
Grand Prize
Merit Prize
For films in the Taiwan Competition:
Grand Prize
Merit Prize

List of winners of Grand Prize in the international competition

References

External links
TIDF official website

Recurring events established in 1998
Documentary film festivals in Taiwan